In category theory, a branch of mathematics, a dinatural transformation  between two functors

written

is a function that to every object  of  associates an arrow

 of 

and satisfies the following coherence property: for every morphism  of  the diagram

commutes.

The composition of two dinatural transformations need not be dinatural.

See also 
 Extranatural transformation
Natural transformation

References

External links 
 dinatural transformation at the n-Category Lab.

Functors